Yhden Enkelin Unelma ("One Angel's Dream") is a Christmas single by Finnish singer Tarja Turunen, released as Turunen's first solo project ever, when she was still part of the symphonic metal band Nightwish, back in December 2004; it was also released as an Extended Play in limited edition.

Right after the release it debuted at number 2, and ended 2004 after more three weeks at number 1; it started 2005 as number 4, and reached number 1 again in December 2005, after spending 10 weeks on the official Finnish charts. The single has reached Gold Disc status in Finland with more than 7 thousand copies sold.

The single is sung entirely in the Finnish language, and Turunen promoted it with a mini tour holding concerts in Finland, Germany, Spain and Romania, in late 2005.

Track listing

Standard edition

Personnel

References

External links
Turunen's official website

2004 singles
Tarja Turunen songs
Finnish songs
Compositions by Jean Sibelius
2004 songs
Universal Music Group singles